La Perla Spa is a seaside resort created by the unification of five smaller spas along La Perla beach in Mar del Plata, Argentina. The architectural project was designed by Clorindo Testa, and completed in 1985.

References
Clorindo Testa: Architecture Information
Balnearios en Mar del Plata 

Buildings and structures in Mar del Plata
Commercial buildings completed in 1985
Tourist attractions in Mar del Plata

Beaches of Argentina